Hayder Sherefa Juber (born 11 January 1994) is an Ethiopian professional footballer who plays as an midfielder for Ethiopian Premier League club Saint George and the Ethiopia national team.

Career
Sherefa began his career with Dedebit, followed with stints at Hadiya Hossana and Mekelle 70 Enderta. He signed with Saint George on 11 September 2019.

International career
Sherefa made his international debut with the Ethiopia national team in a 4–3 2020 African Nations Championship qualification win over Djibouti on 4 August 2019.

Honours
Mekelle 70 Enderta
Ethiopian Premier League: 2018–19

References

External links
 
 

1994 births
Living people
Ethiopian footballers
Ethiopia international footballers
Ethiopian Premier League players
Association football midfielders
Mekelle 70 Enderta F.C. players
Saint George S.C. players
Hadiya Hossana F.C. players